Kevin Austin Dawtry (born 15 June 1958) is an English former footballer who played in the Football League for Southampton, Crystal Palace, AFC Bournemouth and Reading.

References

External links
 

English footballers
English Football League players
1958 births
Living people
Southampton F.C. players
Crystal Palace F.C. players
AFC Bournemouth players
Reading F.C. players
Road-Sea Southampton F.C. players
Association football midfielders